Araeomerus morrisi is a species of earwig, in the genus Araeomerus, family Hemimeridae, suborder Hemimerina.

References 

Hemimerina
Insects described in 1963